Frank Miles Day (April 5, 1861 – June 15, 1918) was a Philadelphia-based architect who specialized in residences and academic buildings.

Career
In 1883, he graduated from the Towne School of the University of Pennsylvania, and traveled to Europe. In England, he apprenticed under two architects, and won the 1885 prize from the Architectural Association of London. He returned to Philadelphia, and worked in the offices of George T. Pearson and Addison Hutton, before opening his own office in 1887. Day's first major commission was the Art Club of Philadelphia (1889–90, demolished 1975-76), on South Broad Street in Center City, Philadelphia. His brother Henry joined the firm in 1893 (Frank Miles Day & Brother), and Charles Zeller Klauder, who had been his chief draftsman since 1900, became a partner in 1911 (Day Brothers & Klauder). From 1912 to 1927, even after Day's 1918 death, the firm was known as Day & Klauder.

Day was a lecturer in architecture at the University of Pennsylvania and Harvard University, and taught perspective at the Pennsylvania Academy of the Fine Arts. He was supervising architect for Yale University and Johns Hopkins University, and supervising or executive architect for Pennsylvania State College (now University), New York University, Delaware College (now University of Delaware), and the University of Colorado.

Day made major additions to the campuses of the University of Pennsylvania, Pennsylvania State University and Wellesley College. Day & Klauder designed 18 buildings for Princeton University, although half were Klauder's work, completed after Day's death. Day's 1917 master plan for the University of Delaware was inspired by Thomas Jefferson's plan for the University of Virginia. Following the firm's 1917 master plan for the Boulder campus, Klauder went on to design much of the University of Colorado.

Day was national president of the American Institute of Architects, 1906–07; a founding editor of House & Garden Magazine; and author of a number of books, including American Country Houses of Today (1915). In 1910, he was elected into the National Academy of Design as an Associate Academician.

Day is interred at West Laurel Hill Cemetery in Bala Cynwyd, Pennsylvania.

Selected works

Philadelphia buildings
Edward Wood houses, 245-47 S. 17th St. (1888–90) Now the Black Sheep Pub.
Art Club of Philadelphia, 220 S. Broad St. (1889–90, demolished 1975–76)
Alterations to Tenth Presbyterian Church, 1700–08 Spruce St. (1893)
New Horticultural Hall, 250 S. Broad St. (1894–96, demolished 1917)
American Baptist Publication Society, 1420-22 Chestnut St. (1896–97).
C. B. Newbold residence, 1313 Locust St. (1897)
"Cogslea" (Violet Oakley residence & studio), 615 St. Georges Rd., Mount Airy (1902).
Philadelphia Art Alliance (Samuel P. Wetherill mansion), 251 S. 18th St. (1906)
Vernon Park Branch, Free Library of Philadelphia, 5708 Germantown Ave., Germantown (1906)
Second Church of Christian Scientist, 5443 Greene St., Germantown (1918–25), (now Taulane Assembly Building, Germantown Friends School)

University of Pennsylvania
Houston Hall, 3417 Spruce St., University of Pennsylvania, designed with William C. Hays and Milton D. Medary (1894)
Pedestal of Benjamin Franklin Statue, John J. Boyle, sculptor, College Hall, 3420 Locust Walk, University of Pennsylvania (1896–99). Moved from 9th & Chestnut Sts., 1939.
University of Pennsylvania Museum, 3260 South St., University of Pennsylvania, designed with Wilson Eyre and Cope & Stewardson (1899)
Franklin Field (2nd stadium), 33rd & Spruce Sts., University of Pennsylvania (1903, demolished 1922). The current Franklin Field is the 3rd stadium on the site, designed in 1922 by Day's partner, Charles Zeller Klauder, with the upper deck (also by Klauder) added in 1925.
Weightman Hall ("The Fieldhouse"), 233-35 S. 33rd St., University of Pennsylvania (1903–04)

Princeton University
Holder Hall Quadrangle, Princeton University, (1909)
Memorial Tower, Princeton University, (1911)
Hamilton Hall, Princeton University, (1911)
Princeton University Clubhouse, Princeton University, (1911)
Cuyler Hall Dormitories, Princeton University, (1913)
Princeton Hall (Quadrangle Club), Princeton University, (1913)
Madison Hall Dining Complex ("The Commons"), Princeton University, (1916)
Sage Hall Dormitories, Princeton University, (1916)
Pyne Hall and Gymnasium, Princeton University, (1922)

The Pennsylvania State University
Stock Pavilion, Pennsylvania State College, State College, Pennsylvania (1913)
Liberal Arts Buildings, Pennsylvania State College, State College, Pennsylvania (1913–37)
Chemical Building, Pennsylvania State College, State College, Pennsylvania (1914)
Dairy & Creamery Building, Pennsylvania State College, State College, Pennsylvania (1914)
Mining Building, Pennsylvania State College, State College, Pennsylvania (1915, demolished)

University of Delaware
Harter Hall Dormitories, Delaware College, Newark, Delaware (1916)
Wolf Hall Science Building, Delaware College, Newark, Delaware (1917)
Sussex Hall Dormitories, Delaware College, Newark, Delaware (1917)
Sigma Phi Epsilon fraternity, Delaware College, Newark, Delaware (1919)

Buildings Elsewhere
Madison Public Library (Carnegie Library), 1249 Williamson St., Madison, Wisconsin (1904–06), now Grieg Chorus Club.
Tuberculosis Hospital, 4600 Arkansas Ave. NW, Washington, D.C. (1908, demolished)
Parish House & Rectory, Trinity Episcopal Church, Wilmington, Delaware (1909–10)
Gymnasium, Mercersburg Academy, Mercersburg, Pennsylvania (1911)
Dormitories, Mercersburg Academy, Mercersburg, Pennsylvania (1912)
New Haven Hospital, New Haven, Connecticut (1912, expanded by Day & Klauder 1914-26)
Dormitories, Cornell University, Ithaca, New York (1912–19)
Textile Building, Rhode Island School of Design, Providence, Rhode Island (1914)
Charlton Yarnall residence at Crum Creek Farm (1914) 2600 Wayland Road Berwyn, Pennsylvania (currently the offices of Melmark School) 
Founders Hall, Wellesley College, Wellesley, Massachusetts (1915)
Sigma Phi Fraternity, Cornell University, Ithaca, New York (1915–16)
Hartford Theological Seminary, Hartford, Connecticut (1915–16)
Lapham Field House, Yale University, New Haven, Connecticut (1917–23)
McCormick Theological Seminary, Chicago (1918)
J. L. Ketterlinus summer home, Bar Harbor, Maine (1896)

Gallery

References

External links

Frank Miles Day at Architectural Archives, University of Pennsylvania
Frank Miles Day at Philadelphia Architects and Buildings
Frank Mead: 'A New Type of Architecture in the Southwest,' Part I, 1890-1906 for much on Day's early mentorship of Frank Mead and Charles Barton Keen.

1861 births
1918 deaths
Architects from Philadelphia
University of Pennsylvania alumni
University of Pennsylvania faculty
Harvard Graduate School of Design faculty
University of Delaware people
Johns Hopkins University people
Pennsylvania State University people
New York University staff
Fellows of the American Institute of Architects
Presidents of the American Institute of Architects
Defunct architecture firms based in Pennsylvania
Pennsylvania Academy of the Fine Arts faculty
Princeton University people
Members of the American Academy of Arts and Letters